The Somalia national u23 football team nicknamed The pirates of the oceans, represents Somalia in men's international u23 football. It is controlled by the Somali Football Federation (SFF), and is a member of the Confederation of African Football (CAF) and the Union of Arab Football Associations (UAFA).

History
The Somali Youth League (SYL), the nation's first political party, had put together a team of local youth to play against the Italian expatriate teams. This was seen as the first Somali youth team. To this day, most Somalis see the Somali Youth League (SYL) as the main source of Somali youth footballers. Somalia's national u23 football team is relatively new and they have only played 1 match (against Rwanda u23 for u23 CAF 2017) in which the coach, Mbabazi stated the team was "too weak for Rwanda u23."

Current squad

|caps=|club=Unknown|clubnat=Somalia}}
|caps=|club=Unknown|clubnat=Somalia}}
|caps=|club=Unknown|clubnat=Somalia}}
|caps=|club=Unknown|clubnat=Somalia}}
|caps=|club=Unknown|clubnat=Somalia}}

|caps=|club=Unknown|clubnat=Somalia}}
|caps=|club=Unknown|clubnat=Somalia}}
|caps=|club=Unknown|clubnat=Somalia}}
|caps=|club=Unknown|clubnat=Somalia}}
|caps=|club=Unknown|clubnat=Somalia}}
|caps=|club=Unknown|clubnat=Somalia}}
|caps=|club=Unknown|clubnat=Somalia}}
|caps=|club=Unknown|clubnat=Somalia}}
|caps=|club=Unknown|clubnat=Somalia}}
|caps=|club=Unknown|clubnat=Somalia}}
|caps=|club=Unknown|clubnat=Somalia}}
|caps=|club=Unknown|clubnat=Somalia}}
|caps=|club=Unknown|clubnat=Somalia}}
|caps=|club=Unknown|clubnat=Somalia}}
|caps=|club=Unknown|clubnat=Somalia}}

Sources/References
All things on this page are sourced from http://www.soka25east.com/somalia-u23-coach-mbabazi-admits-team-too-weak-for-rwanda-u23/

African national under-23 association football teams
U